Joseph Knowles (16 December 1871 – 1955) was an English professional footballer who played as a full-back for Sunderland.

References

1871 births
1955 deaths
Footballers from Sunderland
English footballers
Association football fullbacks
Monkwearmouth F.C. players
Sunderland A.F.C. players
Tottenham Hotspur F.C. players
South Shields F.C. (1889) players
Queens Park Rangers F.C. players
English Football League players
Date of death missing